The Krueger House is a historic house in Stuart, Martin County, Florida. It is located on the grounds of the historic Burn Brae Plantation. On February 14, 2002, it was added to the U.S. National Register of Historic Places.

History
Albert Rudolph Emil Krueger, a Berlin native who initially immigrated to New York City, moved southward in 1887 and began growing pineapples and oranges. He bought the 80 acre property in Stuart the 1890 and established the Burn Brae pineapple plantation. Burn Brae in scottish, means house on the hill by the water. The name derived from his wife Annie's Scottish heritage.

In 1894, he built his grand frame vernacular estate on the plantation grounds along a creek that meandered inland from the St. Lucie River.The creek (today called the Krueger Creek) was dredged to allow the transfer of supplies to his pineapple and citrus farms.

Krueger married Annie Donaldson Kincaid Speirs in 1893, and by 1897 had three sons and one daughter needing a bigger home. Contractor Henry Klopp began construction on a two-story grand home in October 1903 and the family moved into the completed home in mid-February 1904. The house features four bedrooms, a large attic room with handmade trusses, and is built with Florida pine. 

The house was restored Bill and Anne Krueger Stimmell from 1997 to 2002.

See also
 National Register of Historic Places listings in Florida

References

External links
 Martin County listings at National Register of Historic Places

National Register of Historic Places in Martin County, Florida
Houses in Martin County, Florida
Plantation houses in Florida